Stages on Life's Way (historical orthography: Stadier paa Livets Vej) is a philosophical work by Søren Kierkegaard written in 1845.  The book was written as a continuation of Kierkegaard's prior work Either/Or. While Either/Or is about the aesthetic and ethical realms, Stages continues onward to the consideration of the religious realms. Kierkegaard's "concern was to present the various stages of existence in one work if possible." His father Michael Pedersen read Christian Wolff, and Søren himself was influenced by both Wolff and Kant to the point of using the structure and philosophical content of the three special metaphysics as the scheme or blueprint for building the ideas for this book.

But Kierkegaard wasn't satisfied until the completion of Concluding Unscientific Postscript in 1846. Here he wrote: "When my Philosophical Fragments had come out and I was considering a postscript to “clothe the issue in its historical costume,” yet another pseudonymous book appeared: Stages on Life’s Way, a book that has attracted the attention of only a few (as it itself predicts) perhaps also because it did not, like Either/Or, have The Seducer’s Diary, for quite certainly that was read most and of course contributed especially to the sensation. That Stages has a relation to Either/Or is clear enough and is definitely indicated by the use in the first two sections of familiar names." Later in the same book he said, 

David F. Swenson cited this book when discussing Kierkegaard's melancholy which was corroborated by Kierkegaard's older brother Peter Christian Kierkegaard. However, Kierkegaard could have been writing about Jonathan Swift. The background is the giving of a banquet yet it seems so difficult; Constantine, from Repetition says he would never risk putting one on. 
Kierkegaard says, "repetition that involved good luck and inspiration is always a daring venture because of the ensuing comparison, an absolute requirement of richness of expression is made, since it is not difficult to repeat one's own words or to repeat a felicitously chosen phrase word for word. Consequently, to repeat the same also means to change under conditions made difficult by the precedent. By taking the risk, the pseudonymous author (Hilarius Bookbinder) has won an indirect victory over the inquisitive public. That is, when this reading public peers into the book and sees the familiar names Victor Eremita and Constantin Constantius, etc., it tosses the book aside and says wearily: It is just the same as Either/Or." But Kierkegaard maintains it is the author's job to make it "the same, and yet changed, and yet the same". He continued writing for 494 pages in Hong's translation and in his "Concluding Word" says, "My dear reader-but to whom am I speaking? Perhaps no one at all is left."

In Vino Veritas
The subtitle is A Recollection Related by William Afham. Paul Sponheim says in his introduction to Lowrie's translation that Afham means Byhim in Danish. The book is divided rather sharply into sections, this first being the equivalent of the first part of Either/Or and is equivalent with religiousness A. "Religiousness A is the dialectic of inward deepening; it is the relation to an eternal happiness that is not conditioned by something but is the dialectical inward deepening of the relation, consequently conditioned only by the inward deepening, which is dialectical." This is the individual who is living in an esthetic way. A young man or woman who is still maturing. Still looking for the highest good. They've found love of a woman to be the highest but none have had any experience except for the seducer. Who may or not be telling the truth. Kierkegaard says, "Even “The Seducer’s Diary” was only a possibility of horror, which the esthete in his groping existence had conjured up precisely because he, without actually being anything, had to try his hand at everything as possibility."

In a conscious reference to Plato's Symposium, it is determined that each participant must give a speech, and that their topic shall be love. Lee M. Hollander said, "it excels Plato's work in subtlety, richness, and refined humor. To be sure, Kierkegaard has charged his creation with such romantic superabundance of delicate observations and rococo ornament that the whole comes dangerously near being improbable; whereas the older work stands solidly in reality." Plato and Kierkegaard may have been testing the reader's ability to discern truth from fiction or poetry. It is possible that Plutarch's The Banquet of the Seven Wise Men may have also influenced Kierkegaard.

He has Victor Eremita, the Young Man, the Fashion Designer, Constantine, Johannes the Seducer speak about love. Constantin, the psychologist, mediates between the speakers. Tellingly for the reader, however, each account given is ultimately disheartening. The inexperienced young man, for example, considers it to be simply disturbingly puzzling. To the seducer, it is a game to be won, while the foppish fashion designer considers it to be simply a style, empty of real meaning, which he can control like any other style. These individuals believe that "he who has hidden his life has lived well." All the speakers at the banquet say "love is ludicrous."

Kierkegaard compared this section with Philine in Johann Goethe's Wilhelm Meister's Apprenticeship. He took up Goethe's Dichtung und Wahrheit (My Life: Poetry and Truth) in the third section of this book, Guilty/Not-Guilty.

Goethe reflected on his life in almost all of his books. A, or the esthete, in Stages writes about reflection because Kierkegaard has found that he has made an art of recollection and reflection also.

Some Reflections on Marriage in Answer to Objections — By a Married Man
The second section of the book begins with the party's interruption by the nearby passing, and stopping, of a carriage containing one William Afham and his wife. He's experience speaking to possibility. Afham wants to stop A from "moving restlessly from possibility to possibility [because it] will ultimately end in despair." Even so, Kierkegaard himself remained a bachelor all his life. But he found meaning in life that was not associated with the married state. He says, "The resolution of marriage is a positive resolution and essentially the most positive of all; its opposite is also a resolution that resolves not to will to actualize the task."

He  says, "Ordinarily we speak only of a married man’s unfaithfulness, but what is just as bad is a married man’s lack of faith. Faith is all that is required, and faith compensates for everything. Just let understanding and sagacity and sophistication reckon, figure out, and describe how a married man ought to be: there is only one attribute that makes him lovable, and that is faith, absolute faith in marriage. Just let experience in life try to define exactly what is required of a married man’s faithfulness; there is only one faithfulness, one honesty that is truly lovable and hides everything in itself, and that is the honesty toward God and his wife and his married estate in refusing to deny the miracle." He's against system builders in the realm of marriage just as he's against them in the realm of the religious.

This section corresponds to what Kierkegaard called religiousness B."Religiousness B, or paradoxical religiousness, or religiousness that has the dialectical in second place make conditions in such a way that the conditions are not the dialectical concentrations of inward deepening but a definite something that qualifies the eternal happiness more specifically (whereas in A the more specific qualification of inward deepening is the only more specific qualification), not by qualifying more specifically the individual’s appropriation of it but by qualifying more specifically the eternal happiness, yet not as a task for thinking but as paradoxically repelling and giving rise to new pathos." 
Howard Hong said the three sections of Stages on Life's Way were meant to complement the Three Discourses on Imagined Occasions published only one day earlier. The discourse on marriage corresponds to On the Occasion of a Wedding.

"Guilty?"/"Not Guilty?"
Victor Eremita was the pseudonymous author of Either/Or who wrote the preface to the book. In the preface he buys a writing desk in which there is a secret compartment containing the papers of A and B.  In this book the writer of the preface, Hillarius Bookbinder, finds a small packet of papers left over from an old customer, Mr. Literatus, and parts one and two of Stages On Life's Way are found there. A repetition occurs in this third book. He's out fishing with a naturalist. He was there for the sake of science, and the author for the sake of friendship and curiosity. He catches something wrapped in "oil cloth" and finds a box with the papers of this section of the book inside, much like the Greeks kept hope in a box this box contained guilt. This is Quidam's Diary (Kierkegaard used _ "no name"). It is very reminiscent of Johann Goethe's The Sorrows of Young Werther.

This section of the book corresponds to the third discourse from Three Discourses on Imagined Occasions published one day earlier, The Decisiveness of Death or At the Side of a Grave. The manuscript proves to be the diary of a young man written much in the style of Night Thoughts by Edward Young. He writes morning and evening thoughts that alternate between his guilt and his innocence. Later, in 1847 he wrote once more about this problem of guilt as he had earlier in 1843. Either/Or Part II Hong p. 341 The Upbuilding That Lies in the Thought That in Relation to God We Are Always in the Wrong and Upbuilding Discourses in Various Spirits, Hong P. 265 the joy of it that in relation to God a person always suffers as guilty.

He believes "God sanctions intrigues" but that it would do no good for a leper to find a way to move his sores to the inside of his body. He would still be found guilty by someone. But he sticks to his thesis with proof from Solomon's dream.

He writes about what could be interpreted as accusations against himself regarding Regine Olsen. And admits he's "really no religious individuality; I am just a regular and perfectly constructed possibility of such a person. With a sword hanging over my head, in peril of my life, I discover the religious crisis with a primitivity such as if I had not known of them before, with such a primitivity that if they had not been I would have to discover them." But Kierkegaard has already said he is none of the pseudonymous authors. Yet in some way he is them all.

This unending guilt leads him to ask, "What similarity is there between her sorrow and mine, what solidarity is there between guilt and innocence, what kinship is there between repentance and an esthetic sorrow over life, when that which awakens repentance is that which awakens her sorrow? I can sorrow in my way; if she must sorrow, she must also do it on her own account. A girl may submit to a man in many things, but not in the ethical; and it is unethical for her and for me to sorrow jointly in this way. Taking this path, how will she ever come to sorrow religiously when she must leave undecided an ethical issue such as my behavior toward her, when it is indeed over its result that she wishes to sorrow. Would that I might be a woman for half a year so that I could learn how she is dissimilar to man."

The guilty-not guilty discussions by Marie Beaumarchais, Donna Elvira, and Margarete were written in Kierkegaard's Either/Or (1843).  Marie Beaumarchais says of Goethe's Clavigo, "Yes, he was a deceiver. Otherwise, how could he stop loving me?" "He was no deceiver. What snatched him away, I do not know; I do not know that dark power, but it pained him personally, pained him deeply." Kierkegaard understands that both men and women suffer from guilt and deception. He repeated the discussion again in the same book between Johannes the Seducer and Cordelia.

Letter to the Reader
Kierkegaard finished his book with a Letter to the Reader from Frater Taciturnus (Brother Silent). He was upset that the critics had not a done good job on Either/Or so he decided to contact his readers directly. He begins with analogies: 

He states it was his task to present "an unhappy love affair in which love is dialectical in itself and in the crisis of infinite reflection acquires a religious aspect." His task resulted in an editorial from the Danish newspaper The Corsair directed at Frater Taciturnus which brought Kierkegaard into open conflict with Peder Ludvig Møller and Meïr Goldschmidt. The Corsair had reviewed Either/Or March 10, 1843, it had been published on February 20, 1843. On July 4, 1845 the Corsair praised Hilarious Bookbinder for his work on Stages. Victor Eremita was praised for his work on Either/Or once again in November and then in December Moller wrote A Visit in Soro and Frater Taciturnus replied with The Activity of a Traveling Estetician and How He Still Happened to Pay for the Dinner. The newspaper began to caricature Kierkegaard after he wrote to them in reply after reply. Kierkegaard wrote the following in his Journals in relation to this external episode in his life as an author.

Criticism
Georg Brandes is credited with introducing Soren Kierkegaard to the reading public with his 1879 biography about him, he also wrote an analysis of the works of Henrik Ibsen and Bjørnstjerne Bjørnson in which he made many comparisons between their works and the works of Kierkegaard. Brandes' translator called Stages on Life's Way, Stages on the Path of Life, in 1899. He considered Stages on Life's Way in relation to Either/Or and the works of Ibsen. This is what Brandes had to say: 

The Review of Reviews in 1894 discussed Kierkegaard's book in relation to his affair with Regine Olsen like this: 

Douglas V. Steere translated part of Kierkegaard's Edifying Discourses in Diverse Spirits and wrote an introduction to David F. Swenson and Lillian Marvin Swenson's translation of Works of Love. He wrote the following in his introduction to Works of Love: 

John Daniel Wild wrote the following in 1959: 

Julia Watkin says the bulk of Stages was composed between September 1844 and March 1845. And that Quidam's diary is the conterpart of the seducer's diary. Naomi Lebowitz said, "Kierkegaard takes his most cherished model Socrates, who hid his beauty behind the Silenus skin of a "hectoring satyr". He spends his whole life, says Alcibiades in the Symposium, a favorite dialogue of Kierkegaard, pretending and playing with people, and I doubt whether anyone has ever seen the treasures which are revealed when he grows serious and exposes what he keeps inside. And he would imitate Christ, in whom everything is revealed and everything hidden, so that his words are heard as offense and stumbling blocks."

Walter Lowrie notes that Kierkegaard wrote a "repetition of Either/Or" because it stopped with the ethical. "He said of it that, like Aladdin's palace, it was left with an unfinished window,  this lack he proposed to supply by adding a story entitled Guilty?/Not Guilty? He advised readers to read the Eighteen Upbuilding Discourses as well as Three Discourses on Imagined Occasions "to understand how it is that Quidam's Diary leads up to and into the religious stage."

Paul Sponheim, in his introduction to Lowrie's translation of Stages, compares the book with Fear and Trembling. He agrees that the religious stage is not "fully stated in Stages because Quidam cannot understand the paradigm "for he fails to speak of the forgiveness of sins, which lies outside his task.

Thom Satterlee, a Danish translator and novelist has Soren Kierkegaard as one of the characters in his 2013 book, The Stages.

In 1988 Mary Elizabeth Moore discusses Kierkegaard's method of indirect communication in this book.

References

External links 

 In Vino Veritas, The Banquet, Part 1 of Stages on Life's Way
 Stages on Life's Way audio from Librivox
 Stages on Life’s Way in Encyclopædia Britannica
 D. Anthony Storm's Commentary on Stages on Life's Way
 Soren Kierkegaard, A Study of the third section of his Stadia Upon Life's Way, by Reverend Alexander Grieve The Expository times. v.19 1907/1908 Oct-Sep
 Original text in Danish at sks.dk
 

1845 books
Books by Søren Kierkegaard
Works published under a pseudonym